James Honeybone (born 11 January 1991) is a five times British champion fencer. At the 2012 Summer Olympics, he competed in the Men's sabre, but was defeated in the first round.

He began fencing at the age of 9, and trained in Hungary for two years.

He won the British sabre national title at the British Fencing Championships in 2012, 2013, 2015, 2017 and 2018.

References

External links

 Profile  at the European Fencing Confederation

British male sabre fencers
Olympic fencers of Great Britain
Fencers at the 2012 Summer Olympics
Living people
1991 births
European Games competitors for Great Britain
Fencers at the 2015 European Games